Rotta is a 16th and 17th century music composition for brass instruments that consists of sections of irregular music phrases in which the rhythmic activity gradually dissipates. These compositions were played directly after a trumpet ensemble sonata, and eventually the components of this composition were merged into sonata form at which point the rotta disappeared from the repertoire.

References

Compositions by musical form
Renaissance compositions